Elçiler is a village in the Tut District, Adıyaman Province, Turkey. Its population is 48 (2021).

References

Villages in Tut District